The 2021 Zinsser SmartCoat 200 was the 10th race of the 2021 ARCA Menards Series season, the fourth race of the 2021 Sioux Chief Showdown, and the 21st iteration of the event. The race was held on Saturday, July 17, 2021 in Marne, Michigan at Berlin Raceway, a  permanent oval-shaped racetrack. The race took the scheduled 200 laps to complete. At race's end, Daniel Dye of GMS Racing would dominate, leading almost every single lap and win his first ever ARCA Menards Series win. To fill out the podium Ty Gibbs of Joe Gibbs Racing and Corey Heim of Venturini Motorsports would finish second and third, respectively.

Background 
Berlin Raceway is a 7/16 mile long paved oval race track in Marne, Michigan, near Grand Rapids. The track races weekly as part of NASCAR's Whelen All-American Series. It currently hosts a race in the ARCA Menards Series East tour. The track has held touring series events on the ARCA Menards Series, American Speed Association National Tour, USAC Stock Cars, USAC Silver Crown, World of Outlaws Sprint cars, and World of Outlaws Late Model Series tours.

The track opened in 1950. It was originally a horse track before World War II. Berlin's current track record is 12.513 seconds, set by Brian Gerster in 2018 in a winged sprint car. Berlin Raceway takes its name from the city of Marne's original name "Berlin," which was changed due to Anti-German sentiment following World War I.

The track was developed by the Chester Mysliwiec family in 1950. It was purchased by the West Michigan Whitecaps in 2001. The group made numerous improvements to the facilities such as new bathrooms, updated catch fences, and a new sound system. Dirt was temporarily placed over the pavement after the 2017 regular season and three touring series visited the track in September / October - American Ethanol Late Model Tour, American Ethanol Modified Tour and Engine Pro Sprints On Dirt. Some racing scenes for the movie God Bless the Broken Road were recorded at the track in early 2016 for the 2018 film. The track dropped its Super Stock and Modified classes in 2020 and added a class of Limited Late Models. Other classes include Super Late Models, Sportsman, 4 Cylinder, and Mini-Wedges.

Entry list

Practice

First and final practice 
The only 45-minute practice session would take place on Saturday, July 17, at 4:15 PM EST.

Qualifying 
Qualifying would take place on Saturday, July 17, at 6:00 PM EST. Each driver would have two laps to have a chance to set a lap, and the fastest of the two would be taken.

Full qualifying results

Race results

References 

2021 ARCA Menards Series
Zinsser SmartCoat 200
Zinsser SmartCoat 200